Denis Kindl (born August 4, 1992) is a Czech professional ice hockey player. He is currently playing for HC Skoda Plzeň of the Czech Extraliga.

Kindl made his Czech Extraliga debut playing with HC Oceláři Třinec during the 2014-15 Czech Extraliga season.

References

External links

1992 births
Living people
HC Karlovy Vary players
HC Oceláři Třinec players
Gatineau Olympiques players
Montreal Junior Hockey Club players
Cape Breton Screaming Eagles players
Czech ice hockey centres
HC Plzeň players
People from Šumperk
Sportspeople from the Olomouc Region
Hokej Šumperk 2003 players
HC Frýdek-Místek players
LHK Jestřábi Prostějov players
HC Dynamo Pardubice players
HC Olomouc players
Czech expatriate ice hockey players in Canada